Love Finds You in Sugarcreek, Ohio (titled Stranger In An Amish Town in the UK) is a film adaption of the novel of the same title by Serena B. Miller. Directed by Terry Cunningham, produced by George Shamieh, distributed by Mission Pictures International, production by Belltower Productions, and funded by Three Point Capital. The production was filmed on location in Holmes County, Ohio with a majority of the filming taking place in Sugarcreek, Ohio during the fall of 2013 which coincided with the time frame set by the Novel. The film first aired on Up (TV network) in June, 2014, with a subsequent release scheduled later internationally and on DVD.

Plot summary
Rachel Troyer (Sarah Lancaster) is a smart, focused, single policewoman in the quaint town of Sugarcreek, nicknamed "The Little Switzerland of Ohio" and located about an hour south of Akron, in the heart of Amish country.  She frequently looks in on her three kindly Amish aunts Bertha (Kelly McGillis), Anna (Marianna Alacchi) and Lydia (Annie Kitral), who raised Rachel from girlhood after she was orphaned and are the proprietors of a picturesque, although faded, farmhouse inn.  When a mysterious, scruffy stranger, Joe (Tom Everett Scott), shows up on the inn’s doorstep with his five-year-old son, Bobby (Thomas Kapanowski), the aunts insist on taking the pair in as a matter of faith and good will.  Rachel’s police instincts immediately tell her that this seemingly broke outsider is much too refined to be the drifter he presents himself to be.  So, while the aunts welcome Joe as a handyman and enjoy having a child around the Sugar Haus Inn again, a wary, suspicious – yet attracted – Rachel becomes determined to uncover his identity.  Her digging not only reveals his surprising identity, but the fact that he’s run away from his home, his life, and a shocking unsolved murder.  Unfortunately, Rachel’s digging doesn’t go unnoticed, which brings Joe’s past – and its violence – right into this quiet Amish community.Differences
Although the majority of the script stays true to the novel, there are a few differences including some character name changes and the addition or subtraction of some characters.
 Stephanie Anne Fowler (the pregnant teenager from the novel) was not included in the film, and the character was replaced by Elise for the film.
 Dr. Robert Matthias (Joe's estranged father from the novel) was not included in the film.
 Troyer (The family name Troyer'' was replaced by a less common, for the Sugarcreek area, name Troyler)

Cast

References

External links

 Official Serena B. Miller US web site
 
 Mission Pictures International
 Up TV
 Belltower Productions
 Three Point Capital

Films based on American novels
Films shot in Ohio
2014 films